The 2011 NSC Minnesota Stars season was the club's first season in the North American Soccer League, the second tier of the American soccer pyramid, and second season of existence.

Roster

Staff
Head coach  Manny Lagos
Assistant coach  Carl Craig
Player Coach  Kevin Friedland

Transfers

Winter

In:

Out:

Summer

In:

Out:

Competitions

NASL

Standings

Results summary

Results by round

Matches

NASL Playoffs

Soccer Bowl

U.S. Open Cup 

The Minnesota Stars were denied entry in to the 2011 U.S. Open Cup.

Squad statistics

Appearances and goals

|-
|colspan="14"|Players away from Minnesota Stars on loan:

|-
|colspan="14"|Players who left Minnesota Stars during the season:

|}

Goal scorers

Disciplinary record

See also

References 

2011
American soccer clubs 2011 season
2011 North American Soccer League season
NSC Minnesota